Jack Davis Griffo (born December 11, 1996) is an American actor. He starred as Max Thunderman on the Nickelodeon series The Thundermans (2013–2018). Griffo also had starring roles in the network's original movies Jinxed and Splitting Adam, and the Netflix original series Alexa & Katie.

Career

Acting
Griffo first made appearances as an extra in 2011, on the television series Kickin' It and Bucket & Skinner's Epic Adventures. He followed this up with several guest appearances on television series such as See Dad Run  and Jessie.

From 2013 to 2018, Griffo starred in the Nickelodeon series The Thundermans, where he played Max Thunderman, the twin brother who strived to become a supervillain (his twin sister Phoebe is played by Kira Kosarin). In the same year, Griffo starred alongside Ciara Bravo in the Nickelodeon original film Jinxed.

Griffo starred alongside Isabela Moner, Tony Cavalero, and Jace Norman in the Nickelodeon original movie Splitting Adam, which aired in February 2015. He played the role of Billy, the boyfriend of Fin Shepard (Ian Ziering)'s daughter Claudia Shepard (Ryan Newman), in the Syfy original movie Sharknado 3: Oh Hell No!, which premiered on July 22, 2015. In 2016, Griffo guest-starred in the season 7 finale of NCIS: Los Angeles as a military cadet named McKenna.

In 2017, Griffo played the role of Sebastian in the inspirational family drama film Apple of My Eye (originally titled And Then There Was Light). That same year, he was cast as Noah in the indie drama film Those Left Behind. In August 2017 Griffo was added to the cast of the Netflix original series Alexa & Katie, playing the recurring role of Dylan. He guest starred in School of Rock, Knight Squad, and SEAL Team. In 2020, Griffo starred as Sean Davis in the action film The 2nd alongside Ryan Phillippe. In 2020, he had a minor role in the Lifetime original movie The Christmas High Note.

Music

Griffo has a YouTube channel where he posts music covers. As of November 2019, the channel has over 178,000 subscribers and over 8.60 million views. Griffo released a single, "Hold Me", with his friend Kelsey, on October 17, 2011. The music video for "Hold Me" was released on October 29, 2011, and received over 4 million views. He released his solo debut single, "Slingshot", on November 13, 2013, which features Douglas James. The music video for "Slingshot" was released on Griffo's YouTube channel on January 14, 2014, and has received over 1.8 million views.

Filmography

Awards and nominations
Griffo has been nominated for five Kids' Choice Awards for Favorite TV Actor, the first in 2014, the second in 2015, the third in 2016, the fourth in 2017, and the fifth in 2018.

References

External links
 

1996 births
Living people
21st-century American male actors
21st-century American singers
American child singers
American male child actors
American male film actors
American male pop singers
American male singers
American male television actors
Child pop musicians
Male actors from Orlando, Florida